Chen Ming-tong (born 25 November 1955) is a Taiwanese politician and currently the Director-General of the National Security Bureau. He was the Minister of the Mainland Affairs Council from 2018 to 2021 and 2007 to 2008.

Academic career
Chen obtained his bachelor's, master's and doctoral degrees in political science from National Taiwan University (NTU) in 1979, 1981 and 1991, respectively. Chen worked as a researcher in the Research, Development and Evaluation Commission of the Taipei City Government in 1983-1984. After finishing his doctoral degree, he worked as associate professor followed by professor at the Graduate Institute of National Development of NTU from 1992 to 2000.

He was a thesis adviser to several politicians affiliated with the Democratic Progressive Party, including Chiu Chih-wei, Kao Chia-yu, Lin Chih-chien, Pan Men-an, and Shen Fa-hui.

Political career
He led the Mainland Affairs Council (MAC) between 2007 and 2008, then returned to NTU. In 2018, he succeeded Katharine Chang as MAC minister.

National Security Bureau
In 2022, he publicly claimed on the basis of intelligence that China was not going to invade Taiwan within the next several years while Tsai Ing-wen remained in office and that the Russian invasion of Ukraine had caused the mainland to re-evaluate their military plans regarding Taiwan. He also claimed that Taiwan had some knowledge of what the makeup of the Politburo Standing Committee of the Chinese Communist Party was going to be after the 20th National Congress of the Chinese Communist Party to be held later in 2022.

His public revelation of this information was criticized by former army Major General Yu Beichen, he alleged that revealing such specific information put intelligence gathering in the mainland at risk.

References

External links

1955 births
Living people
National Taiwan University alumni
Political office-holders in the Republic of China on Taiwan